Valeri Minkenen (born 9 April 1989) is a Finnish retired professional footballer.

Early life and career
Minkenen was born in Leningrad, and he is of Ingrian Finnish descent. He has played in Finland and Estonia for AC Oulu, FC Haka, FC Flora Tallinn and KTP.

References

External links

1989 births
Living people
Finnish footballers
Finnish expatriate footballers
AC Oulu players
FC Haka players
FC Flora players
Kotkan Työväen Palloilijat players
Myllykosken Pallo −47 players
Klubi 04 players
Veikkausliiga players
Meistriliiga players
Association football midfielders
Finnish expatriate sportspeople in Estonia
Expatriate footballers in Estonia
People of Ingrian Finnish descent